Golden One or The Golden One may refer to:

The Golden One, a 1961 novel by Henry Treece
The Golden One (novel), a 2002 novel by Elizabeth Peters
The Golden One, a 2020 comedy special by Whitmer Thomas
Golden 1 Credit Union, an American credit union
Golden 1 Center, an arena in Sacramento, California
El Dorado, a mythical tribal chief of the Muisca people
Hathor, an ancient Egyptian goddess

See also
El Dorado (disambiguation)